Palisa papillata is a species of sea slug, specifically an aeolid nudibranch. It is a marine gastropod mollusc in the family Facelinidae. It is the only species in the genus Palisa.

Distribution
Distribution of Palisa papillata includes Florida, Jamaica and Panama. The holotype of this species was found at Port Royal, Jamaica and a specimen from Miami, Florida was included in the original description.

Description 

The body is elongate. Rhinophores are tuberculate. Oral tentacles are long. Cerata are arranged in clusters forming a single row along each side of the dorsum. Background color is translucent gray with numerous opaque white spots on both the dorsum and cerata. Cerata are with a pale blue digestive gland and characteristic black or dark brown spots at the base. The maximum recorded body length is 15 or 16 mm.

Habitat 
Minimum recorded depth is 0.1 m. Maximum recorded depth is 1 m.

It was found among algae in Panama. It is probably feeding on epiphytic hydroids.

References
This article incorporates Creative Commons (CC-BY-4.0) text from the reference

External links

Facelinidae
Gastropods described in 1964